Fergana electoral district was a constituency created for the 1917 Russian Constituent Assembly election. The electoral district covered the Fergana Oblast. Two lists were in the fray in Fergana; List 1 - Muinul Islam Society and List 2 - All-Fergana List of Deputies of Muslim Organizations. Spirin (1987) indicates that List 2 had links to the Socialist-Revolutionary Party. In the autumn of 1917, a meeting of the Muslim National Committee and the Musavat Party had decided to field Mammad Amin Rasulzadeh as their candidate in Fergana.

The results in the table below are based on data from Soviet historian L. M. Spirin. U.S. historian Oliver Henry Radkey rejected these results as unreliable.

Results

References

Electoral districts of the Russian Constituent Assembly election, 1917